Ștefan Balint (26 January 1926 – 1976) was a Romanian football midfielder.

International career
Ștefan Balint played one friendly game at international level for Romania on 25 May 1952 under coach Gheorghe Popescu I in a 1–0 victory against Poland. He was also part of Romania's squad at the 1952 Summer Olympics.

Honours
CCA București
Divizia A: 1951, 1952, 1953
Cupa României: 1950, 1951, 1952

Notes

References

External links
Ștefan Balint at Labtof.ro

1926 births
1976 deaths
Romanian footballers
Romania international footballers
Association football midfielders
Olympic footballers of Romania
Footballers at the 1952 Summer Olympics
Liga I players
Liga II players
CFR Cluj players
FC Steaua București players
CS Corvinul Hunedoara players